Negator can mean any of the following:

 Negation (as a function of linguistics)
 The sign for negation in logic (usually ¬ or ~)
 an order-reversing self-mapping of the interval [0, 1] used for definition of De Morgan Triplets and in fuzzy set theory as in fuzzy logic.